The 2021 Spring ASUN men's soccer tournament was the 42nd edition of the ASUN Men's Soccer Tournament. It determined the ASUN Conference's automatic berth for the 2020 NCAA Division I men's soccer tournament. The tournament began on April 10, 2021, and concluded on April 18. The final had originally been scheduled for April 17, but the intended final site of Southern Oak Stadium on the Jacksonville University campus in Jacksonville, Florida was rendered unplayable due to severe weather. The match was delayed by a day and moved to the Stetson University campus in DeLand, Florida.

Due to COVID-19 issues, the NCAA moved the 2020–21 men's soccer championship from fall 2020 to spring 2021. Almost all Division I conferences, including the ASUN, moved their men's soccer seasons accordingly. The conference split into two divisions for that season only, with Bellarmine, Lipscomb, and Liberty in the North Division and Florida Gulf Coast, Jacksonville, North Florida, and Stetson in the South Division.

Jacksonville, the winner of the South Division, won the tournament for the second time, defeating Florida Gulf Coast 2–0 in the final. The Dolphins earned their sixth berth to the NCAA Tournament, losing in the first round to American on penalties after a 3–3 draw.

Seeds

Bracket

Results

Quarterfinals

Semifinals

Final

All Tournament Team

References

External links 
 2021 Spring ASUN Men's Soccer Championship
 2021 Spring ASUN Men's Soccer Tournament Bracket

ASUN Men's Soccer Tournament
ASUN Spring Men's Soccer Tournament
ASUN Spring Men's Soccer Tournament